Eliana Alves dos Santos Cruz (born 1966) is a Brazilian journalist and writer.

Life and career 
Eliana Alves Cruz was born in Rio de Janeiro, in 1966. She graduated in social communication from Faculdade da Cidade in 1989. She took a post-graduate course in corporate communication at Cândido Mendes University. She worked as press manager for the Brazilian Confederation of Aquatic Sports and covered 15 world championships, six Pan-American Games, and six Olympic Games.

She debuted in literature with the novel Água de Barrela, based on the path of her family since the 19th century in Africa. She was the winner of the first edition of the Oliveira Silveira Literary Award, offered by the in 2015..

She published stories in the anthologies Cadernos Negros (Quilombhoje); Perdidas: Histórias para Crianças que Não Tem Vez (Imã Editorial)

She collaborates for the Brazilian edition of The Intercept website, addressing issues related to racism and slavery.

Works

Novels 
 Água de barrela. Brasília-DF: Fundação Cultural Palmares, 2016. 2. ed. Rio de Janeiro: Malê Editora, 2018. 
 O crime do cais do Valongo. Rio de Janeiro: Editora Malê, 2018. 
 Nada digo de ti, que em ti não veja. Rio de Janeiro:  Pallas Editora, 2020.
 Solitária. São Paulo: Companhia das Letras, 2022.

Anthologies 
 Cadernos Negros 39. Organizated by Esmeralda Ribeiro and Márcio Barbosa. São Paulo: Quilombhoje, 2016. (poems).
 Cadernos Negros 40. Organizated by  Esmeralda Ribeiroand Márcio Barbosa. São Paulo: Quilombhoje, 2017. (short stories).
 Novos poetas. Prêmio Sarau Brasil 2017.
 Ciclo Contínuo Editorial. São Paulo: Ciclo Contínuo, 2018. (short stories).

References

External links 
 Flor da Cor - Writer's blog
 Eliana Alves Cruz writings - The Intercept Brasil

Writers from Rio de Janeiro (city)
Brazilian women writers
1966 births
Living people